Frou-Frou, is a French comedy film from 1955, directed by Augusto Genina, written by A. E. Carr, starring Dany Robin and Louis de Funès. The film is also known as "A Girl from Paris".

Plot
Frou-Frou is a 16-year-old peddler. She comes to the attention of four gentlemen who, Pygmalion-like, agree on helping her to improve her situation. They teach her to behave like a lady and introduce her to the upper class. But she falls in love with an unsuccessful artist who commits suicide after he has befathered her with a daughter...

Cast 
 Dany Robin as Antoinette Dubois called "Frou-Frou"
 Louis de Funès as Colonel Cousinet-Duval, one of Frou-Frou's mentors
 Gino Cervi as Prince Vladimir Bilinsky, one of Frou-Frou's mentors
 Philippe Lemaire as Michel Arthus, the young painter
 Ivan Desny as Henri de Gaspard, Frou-Frou's first lover
 Mischa Auer as Grand duke Alexis
 Jean Wall as Jean Sabatier, one of Frou-Frou's mentors
 Umberto Menalti as Count Sigismond Meursault, one of Frou-Frou's mentors
 Daniel Ceccaldi as Chevalier des Grieux, the young man at the masked ball
 Marie Sabouret as Grande duchess Anna Ivanovna, keeper of a Russian restaurant 
 Béatrice Arnac as Rosemonde
 Simone Sylvestre as Ketty
 Mylène Demongeot as The mistress
 Isabelle Pia as Michèle Dubois, Frou-Frou's daughter

References

External links 
 
 
 Frou-Frou (1955) at the Films de France

1955 films
French comedy films
1950s French-language films
French black-and-white films
Films directed by Augusto Genina
Films based on works by Jacques Laurent
1955 comedy films
1950s French films